Anton Yuryevich Prokhorov (born 6 May 1992) is a Russian para-athlete who specializes in sprints. He is a one-time Paralympic champion.

Career
Born 5 May 1992 in the village of Zyryanka, Ishim district, Tyumen Oblast, Prokhorov lost his left hand in an accident at the age of 10. Before shifting to athletics, Prokhorov practiced futsal since 2002. He started practicing athletics seriously in 2009, when his personal coach became Oleg Skomorovsky.

Prokhorov represented Russian Paralympic Committee athletes at the 2020 Summer Paralympics in the 100 m T63 event where he won a gold medal with a world record time of 12.04.

Personal life
He has a son, Oscar, with his wife Anisa. He is a Master of Sport of International Class.

References

1992 births
Living people
Medalists at the World Para Athletics European Championships
Medalists at the World Para Athletics Championships
Paralympic athletes of Russia
Athletes (track and field) at the 2020 Summer Paralympics
Medalists at the 2020 Summer Paralympics
Paralympic medalists in athletics (track and field)
Paralympic gold medalists for the Russian Paralympic Committee athletes
Russian male sprinters
Sportspeople from Tyumen Oblast
21st-century Russian people